The Tagula white-eye or white-throated white-eye (Zosterops meeki) is a species of bird in the family Zosteropidae. It is endemic to Papua New Guinea.

References

Birds described in 1898
Birds of Papua New Guinea
Endemic fauna of Papua New Guinea
Zosterops
Taxonomy articles created by Polbot